Life Partner is a 2009 Indian Hindi romantic comedy film. It stars Govinda, Fardeen Khan, Tusshar Kapoor, Genelia D'Souza and Prachi Desai in lead roles. The film is written and directed by Rumi Jaffery and produced by Abbas–Mustan under their banner, Burmawalla Bros. It is a sequel to partner.

Plot
Karan and Bhavesh are close friends living in Cape Town, South Africa. Karan has a good life, with a well-paying job. He is in a comfortable relationship with his beautiful yet childish and pampered girlfriend Sanjana, who changes her profession every six months, rather disastrously. Her father, who dislikes Karan, always tries to keep her happy and supports her. Bhavesh wishes for an arranged marriage and keeps a diary of all the beautiful things he will do to his wife after marriage. His father Darshan Manibhai Patel is a strict autocrat, patriarch. Jeet does not believe in marriage or love and is a womaniser. He encourages married women into divorcing their spouses so that his living as a divorce lawyer is uncompromised.

Bhavesh's father treats him as young and incapable of marriage, but on his wife's insistence, he travels with his family, along with Karan and Sanjana to Gujarat to find Bhavesh a bride. In Gujarat, they stay at the palatial home of Bhavesh's father's friend, Vijay Singh Jadeja. Bhavesh meets some girls but ends up falling for Prachi, Vijay Singh's daughter, and they get married. During their wedding, Sanjana says "yes" to Karan's proposal as well and they get married the same night.

The movie then switches to the present, where both couples are at court. The judge declares the divorce between Karan and Sanjana and Bhavesh and Prachi valid. The story goes back 6 months earlier, showing what led to the divorces when they came back to Cape Town from India.

After marriage, Karan and Sanjana's family life deteriorates, with Karan wanting domestic stability and Sanjana being a horrible homemaker. Karan finally loses patience with Sanjana after she accidentally burns down their apartment, and yells at her, venting his frustration at her stupidity and his dislike for her father. Shocked and heartbroken, Sanjana leaves and sends a notice of divorce to him the very next morning.

Bhavesh is happy with Prachi, but Prachi is stifled at the old-fashioned ideals and strict rules of Bhavesh's father. She, without her father-in-law's knowledge, applies for a job – the very idea of which angers him. Bhavesh, taking sides with his father, slaps her at the same time Prachi's father arrives. Bhavesh, bound by his father's old-fashioned ideas, is unable to stand by his wife. This ends with Prachi divorcing Bhavesh.

Jeet later changes his lifestyle when he meets Anjali, who turns out to be different from all the other girls he has met, since she does not give up on him and expresses a genuine desire to marry him. He decides to marry her and Karan and Bhavesh shout themselves hoarse at him, stating that since Jeet had facilitated their divorces, he has no right to get married. Jeet explains that he was wrong in taking a negative view of love and marriage and also says that wives or "life partners" always stood by their husbands, thus it is never worth it to break up such a relationship.

At Jeet's wedding, Sanjana enters the party, wearing a "bomb", shouting that Jeet was happily getting married when he had caused her divorce. With five minutes left for the bomb to explode, Karan and Sanjana have an argument as to why their divorce took place. Sanjana's father intervenes by saying that he had been against the relationship from the start, and he had sent the divorce papers to them without their knowledge. With only seconds left, Bhavesh's father also apologises to Prachi and the family for imposing his traditional values on them. However, the "bomb" turns out to be fake. When this is revealed to be a plan concocted by Jeet and Sanjana to bring everyone to admit their mistakes, everyone reconciles with each other.

At the end, Bhavesh's father lets go of his strict ideals and is shown interacting happily and in a modern manner with his family. Jeet becomes a marriage counsellor, now uniting the very people he separated, and Karan unsuccessfully tries to teach Sanjana how to cook.

Cast
 Govinda as Advocate Jeet Oberoi, a divorce lawyer, Karan and Bhavesh’s best friend, Sanjana’s arch enemy, Anjali’s husband
 Fardeen Khan as Karan Malhotra, Jeet and Bhavesh’s best friend, Sanjana’s husband
 Tusshar Kapoor as Bhavesh Patel, Jeet and Karan’s best friend, Darshan’s introvert son, Prachi’s husband
 Genelia D'Souza as Sanjana Jugran / Sanjana Karan Malhotra aka Sanju, Karan’s wife, Jeet’s arch enemy, Mr Jugran’s daughter
 Prachi Desai as Prachi Jadeja / Prachi Bhavesh Patel, Vijay’s daughter, Bhavesh’s wife, Darshan’s daughter in law
 Anupam Kher as Mr. Jugran, Sanjana's father
 Darshan Jariwala as Darshan Manibhai Patel, Bhavesh's father, Vijay’s best friend
 Shoma Anand as Bhavesh's mother
 Vikram Gokhale as Vijay Singh Jadeja, Prachi’s father, Darshan’s best friend
 Amrita Rao as Anjali Kumar/ Anjali Jeet Oberoi (cameo)

Reception
Life Partner netted  overseas in its opening week while it netted  domestically by the third week. It was elevated to average verdict by Box Office India.

In the United States the film grossed $110,240 while it obtained $347,100 from New Zealand, Fiji, the United Kingdom and Malta.

Soundtrack

The music for this film was composed by Pritam and Sachin–Jigar, with lyrics written by Javed Akhtar. The film has seven songs, featuring two remixes.

The song "Gunji Aangna Mein Shehnai" was composed by Sachin–Jigar.

References

External links
 
 
 

2009 films
2000s Hindi-language films
Indian romantic comedy films
Films featuring songs by Pritam
Films scored by Sanjoy Chowdhury
Viacom18 Studios films
2009 romantic comedy films